Begonia cavaleriei is a species of plant in the family Begoniaceae. It is endemic to China. It grows on limestone rocks.

References

Flora of China
cavaleriei
Taxonomy articles created by Polbot